Abresan Metro Station is a station on Tabriz Metro Line 1. The station opened on 25 September 2016. It is located on Tabriz's main street at Abresan bridge.

References

Tabriz Metro stations